Richard Philipps (1661–1750) was a general in the British Army.

Richard Philipps may also refer to:

Richard Philipps (died 1561) (by 1534–1561), MP for Pembroke
Richard Philipps, 1st Baron Milford (first creation) (1744–1823), Welsh landowner and Tory politician
Richard Philipps, 1st Baron Milford (second creation) (1801–1857), British politician and landowner

See also
Richard Phillips (disambiguation)